The 2010 Aegon Championships (also known traditionally as the Queen's Club Championships) was a tennis tournament played on outdoor grass courts. Wesley Moodie and Mikhail Youzhny are the defending champions, but Youzhny chose to compete at Halle instead.Moodie teamed up with Dick Norman, but they lost in the quarterfinals to Novak Djokovic and Jonathan Erlich.Djokovic and Erlich won in the final 6–7(6–8), 6–2, [10–3] against Karol Beck and David Škoch.

Seeds
All seeds receive a bye into the second round.

Draw

Finals

Top half

Bottom half

External links
 Main draw

Doubles